Tepoe Airstrip  is an airstrip serving Pelelu Tepu, Suriname. The runway extends southwest from the village.

Charters and destinations 
Charter Airlines serving this airport are:

See also

 List of airports in Suriname
 Transport in Suriname

References

External links
OurAirports - Tepoe
Tepoe Airstrip
Google Maps - Tepoe

Airports in Suriname
Sipaliwini District